Neil Alan Midgley (born 21 October 1978) in Cambridge, England, is an English professional footballer who plays for Cambridge City. He played for various teams in the Football League.

References

1978 births
Living people
Sportspeople from Cambridge
English footballers
Association football forwards
Ipswich Town F.C. players
Luton Town F.C. players
Kidderminster Harriers F.C. players
Barnet F.C. players
Canvey Island F.C. players
Kettering Town F.C. players
Cambridge City F.C. players
English Football League players
National League (English football) players
Southern Football League players